Kuu Kuu Harajuku is a Japanese-influenced animated children's television series created by singer-songwriter Gwen Stefani. It is based on her Harajuku Lovers merchandise brand, and the show doubles as a brand itself, with a line of tie-in products by Mattel. The show follows a teenage girl group called HJ5 and their manager Rudie as they live in a fantasy version of Tokyo called Harajuku City. HJ5 is a quintet: the four Harajuku Girls (Love, Angel, Music and Baby) with their leader G. Episodes follow the band members and Rudie overcoming obstacles preventing them from performing.

Network Ten in Australia first commissioned an animated series based on the Harajuku Lovers franchise in 2013, but Gwen Stefani first had the idea to turn it into a TV series as early as 2004, when she introduced the brand. The cartoon is animated using Flash by the Malaysian studio Vision Animation, and it was produced with investment funding from the Victorian government agency Film Victoria. The show's music style was based on Stefani's first two studio albums, Love. Angel. Music. Baby. and The Sweet Escape. The American toy manufacturer Mattel launched the Kuu Kuu Harajuku merchandise line in spring 2017.

The series is distributed by the Canadian media company DHX Media (now known as WildBrain). It had its Australian debut on 10 Peach (formerly known as Eleven) on 1 November 2015. A second season premiered on 1 July 2017, and the third premiered on 11 August 2018. DHX Media's Family Channel airs the show in Canada. The series received a mixed reception, as some of the critics disliked the concept's apparent cultural appropriation, which has also been a criticism of Stefani's Harajuku Girls and the Harajuku Lovers brand as a whole.

Overview
The show follows a teenage girl based on Gwen Stefani, nicknamed G, and her friends Love, Angel, Music and Baby, as they form the up-and-coming band HJ5. HJ5's clumsy manager Rudie works hard to book performances for the band, but their gigs are always interrupted. The band always manages to overcome challenges using their combined strengths: G's leadership, Love's intelligence, Angel's creativity, Music's bravery, Baby's enthusiasm and Rudie's determination.

A villain named General NoFun and his assistant, Commander Bo-Ring, often cause problems for HJ5 as they pursue a world without any entertainment. Other supporting characters include Twisty T, a famous music producer whom Rudie is desperate to impress; Say-Wah, an obsessed HJ5 fan who wants to join the band; Colonel Spyke, a stern soldier who dislikes pop music; and Mauve Madison, a talk show host who reports on HJ5.

Episodes

Characters

Main

 G (voiced by Maggie Chretien) is the leader of HJ5. She is trustworthy and level-headed, though sometimes she has her doubts. She's the friendly, honest, and humble one of the band. She keeps the band together, even through their tough times, and is not afraid of any challenge. Her signature colors are aqua, white and black, and she represents bows. She is based on Gwen Stefani and Gretel from the story book named:[Hansel and Gretel].
 Love (voiced by Daisy Masterman) is the smart genius of HJ5. She is intelligent and creative, though sometimes she takes on too much. She has a knack for science, and often comes up with inventions, though some of them backfire. Her signature color is red, and she represents hearts.
 Angel (voiced by Emma Taylor-Isherwood) is the resident fashionista of HJ5. She is bubbly and cheerful, though sometimes she can be a bit of an airhead. She loves fashions and trends, as well as cheering up others. Despite her cheerfulness, she can be very jumpy at some point. Her signature colors are yellow and blue, and she represents stars.
 Music (voiced by Sally Taylor-Isherwood) is the second-in-command and active tomboy who is the lancer of HJ5. She is sarcastic, genuine, and strong-willed, though at times she gets easily annoyed. She is the sassy and fierce force of the band, as well as an exceptional fighter and dancer. Music can be somewhat grumpy at times. Her signature color is purple, and she represents musical notes.
 Baby (voiced by Charlotte Nicdao) is the sweetest girly-girl who is the little sister of HJ5. She is loving and carefree, though sometimes this gets her in trouble. She adores everything that she thinks is cute, and also loves to give hugs. Her signature color is pink, and she represents cuteness.
 Rudie (voiced by Danny Smith) is the enthusiastic manager of HJ5. He works hard to book them gigs; although his bad luck tends to get him and the band in trouble, he deeply cares about their safety. He is associated with checkered-themed colors, most notably in white, black and gray.

Villains
 General No–Fun – the short, serious and notorious leader of Nofunland.
 Commander Bo-Ring – General NoFun's chief assistant and a high-ranking official in Nofunland.
 Say-Wha – an obsessed HJ5 fan with an auto-tuned voice.
 Madame Shhh – a woman who wishes to rid the world of music so that she can live in peace.
 Sammy Starr – a music manager and Rudie's rival.
 Moods Meow – a cat that was owned by the main antagonist, General No–Fun.
 Stegosaurus Stan – an old children's show host who then wants to win back glory and revert everybody (including HJ5) back into toddlers.
 Teen Genie – A rude teenaged genie who wants to use the phrase "whatever".

Recurring
 R.O.D. – HJ5's robotic personal assistant who speaks with a British accent.
 Chewy – HJ5's pet Pomeranian. He is based on Gwen Stefani's pet of the same name. He was originally owned by G.
 Jimmy – Rudie's nephew and an aspiring photographer.
 Twisty – a music producer and millionaire. He loves to wear sneakers.
 Mauve Madison – a popular talk show host and TV personality. She loves the color mauve (hence her name).
 Zookeeper Smythe – A zookeeper that works at the zoo.
 Sparkski – A hero virus who helps the HJ5 with the band's problems.
 Morgan and Macy – A couple of twins that were managed by Sammy Starr.
 Colonel Spyke – captain of the Harajuku Defense Squad who consists of red, yellow, and blue haired soldiers protecting Harajuku from strange creatures and animals.
 Brodie – Rudie's younger cousin who works as an intern for the band.

Production
Kuu Kuu Harajuku is co-produced by Vision Animation in Malaysia, Moody Street Productions in Australia, and Red Flags Fly in the United States. It was produced in association with Film Victoria for the first season and Network Ten for the second. A third season of the series was broadcast in 2018.

Gwen Stefani initially proposed a Harajuku Girls television show or movie after the release of her 2004 studio album Love. Angel. Music. Baby. In Stefani's words, she "wanted to do an animated or live-action Harajuku TV show or movie since the conception of my [first] dance record." Almost a decade later, Stefani pitched an animated series based on the Harajuku Lovers brand at Kidscreen's 2013 Asian Animation Summit. In an interview with USA Today, Stefani explained that the show was not meant to represent the real-life Harajuku district: "the show's DNA, its visual ideas, was taken from Harajuku land, or whatever, but the show is definitely not that. It's a make-believe world where anything can happen." During a January 2014 interview with Women's Wear Daily, Gwen Stefani first revealed that the show had been greenlit by Network Ten and that fifty-two episodes were in development. In December 2014, the show was given the working title KooKoo Harajuku.

Speaking to Broadcasting & Cable about the inspirations for her series, Stefani stated that she had a history with animation as her older brother and No Doubt founder Eric Stefani worked on The Simpsons and The Ren & Stimpy Show. She said, "I grew up with tons of animation in my own life because my brother is an animator." When asked about her feelings on the renewal of Harajuku for a second season, she said "I still haven't digested that I'm even on Nickelodeon. It was a dream that I had a long time ago that came true later in life. I never thought it could happen."

The art style for the show was inspired by the Harajuku district in Tokyo. Four of the series' main characters (Love, Angel, Music and Baby) were modelled after Stefani's Harajuku Girl backup dancers, with body adjustments in order to give them "a modern update for a younger audience." Also unlike the Harajuku Girls, the Kuu Kuu Harajuku characters were designed as "ethnically ambiguous." Gwen Stefani herself served as the template for the series' lead character, G. The series' theme music was performed by Gwen Stefani and was written to incorporate lyrics from some of her past songs. Other music for the show was produced in a style Stefani describes as "similar to the music on my first two records ... a cross between an '80s video game and pop music."

Gwen Stefani officially announced a second season of Kuu Kuu Harajuku in March 2017. The season had been in development since October 2016. Compared to the first season, the second season was written to include more musical numbers and animated performances. A third season premiered in August 2018 in Australia.

Release

Broadcast
Kuu Kuu Harajuku first premiered on 10 Peach (formerly known as Eleven) in Australia on 1 November 2015, and later premiered on ABC Me on 6 December 2016, and on Nick in the US on 3 October. Later, it was moved to Nick Jr. on 3 February 2017. The series also premiered on Family Channel in Canada on 1 November 2016. The series returned to U.S. streaming on the free live TV application Pluto TV. The series also aired on SABC 3 in South Africa from 2018-2020.

Home media
In February 2017, Shout! Factory signed a deal with DHX Media to secure the North American DVD and Blu-ray rights to Kuu Kuu Harajuku.

Reception

Critical response
Emily Ashby of Common Sense Media gave Kuu Kuu Harajuku a mixed review upon its U.S. debut. She praised Love and G as positive role models, stating, "Love stands out for her can-do attitude and her bevy of ideas to solve all kinds of problems, and G is known for her coolness under pressure." In summary, however, Ashby called the cartoon "pretty mindless, and there are better choices for role models for this age group, but it's entertaining nonetheless."

Erica Russell of PopCrush argued that Kuu Kuu Harajukus setting "is not Japan, but a culturally-empty, messily regurgitated Westernization of it. It's a whitewashed 'kawaii' fairy tale." Rae Alexandra of KQED criticized the decision to portray the Harajuku Girls as racially ambiguous, suggesting that "it seems Stefani (or network executives) thought the best way to deal with the overt cultural appropriation was simply 'let's not have them be Asian anymore.'" Likewise, Teresa Jusino of Dan Abrams' The Mary Sue called negative attention to the characters' races, writing, "I notice that the Harajuku Girls are all different colors. Points for diversity, I guess, except that it seems that they appropriated Japanese culture only to just about erase it from this series."

Awards and nominations

References

External links
 
 
  on Eleven

2010s American animated television series
2010s Australian animated television series
2010s Canadian animated television series
2016 American television series debuts
2015 Australian television series debuts
2016 Canadian television series debuts
2016 Malaysian television series debuts
American children's animated action television series
American children's animated adventure television series
American children's animated comedy television series
American children's animated fantasy television series
American children's animated musical television series
Australian children's animated action television series
Australian children's animated adventure television series
Australian children's animated comedy television series
Australian children's animated fantasy television series
Australian children's animated musical television series
Canadian children's animated action television series
Canadian children's animated adventure television series
Canadian children's animated comedy television series
Canadian children's animated fantasy television series
Canadian children's animated musical television series
Malaysian children's animated action television series
Malaysian children's animated adventure television series
Malaysian children's animated comedy television series
Malaysian children's animated fantasy television series
10 Peach original programming
English-language television shows
American flash animated television series
Australian flash animated television series
Canadian flash animated television series
Anime-influenced Western animated television series
Nickelodeon original programming
Nick Jr. original programming
Television series by DHX Media
Animated musical groups
Film and television memes
Teen animated television series